Luciano Mendes Teixeira (born 10 October 1993) is a Guinea-Bissauan professional footballer who plays for as a defensive midfielder for Portuguese lower-league side Coruchense. Between 2010 and 2012, he made six appearances for the Guinea-Bissau national team.

Club career
On 11 August 2012, Teixeira made his debut with Benfica B in a 2012–13 Segunda Liga match against Braga B where he played 72 minutes as a defensive midfielder and scored an own goal at 63rd minute.

He joined Metz during the summer 2013. A year later, he moved to Chaves.

References

External links

1993 births
Living people
Association football midfielders
Bissau-Guinean footballers
Sportspeople from Bissau
Guinea-Bissau international footballers
Étoile Lusitana players
Liga Portugal 2 players
S.L. Benfica B players
FC Metz players
G.D. Chaves players
Lusitano G.C. players
Bissau-Guinean expatriate footballers
Bissau-Guinean expatriate sportspeople in Senegal
Expatriate footballers in Senegal
Bissau-Guinean expatriate sportspeople in Portugal
Expatriate footballers in Portugal
Bissau-Guinean expatriate sportspeople in France
Expatriate footballers in France